The use of comics in education is based on the concept of creating engagement and motivation for students.

Overview
The effectiveness of comics as medium for effective learning and development has been the subject of debate since the origin modern comic book in the 1930s. Sones (1944) notes that comics "evoked more than a hundred critical articles in educational and non-professional periodicals."

The use of comics in education would later attract the attention of Fredric Wertham who noted that the use of comics in education represented "an all-time low in American science."

It has been noted that the use of a narrative form such as a comic "can foster pupils' interest in science" and help students remember what they have learnt and providing a means of fostering discussion. However, it has also been noted that many educators remain "ambivalent" about the use of comic books as an educational tool. Comics have also been used as a medium to communicate health care information on subjects such as diabetes.

In 1978, Pendulum Press published a primer on the value of comics as an educational tool: The Illustrated Format: an Effective Teaching Tool. In the US, the use of comics for education, using the Internet, can be seen on Comics in the Classroom, and the state of Maryland's Comic Book Initiative. Teacher professional development content on how teachers can integrate comics into the classroom is available through the State of California Department of Education's Brokers of Expertis website.

See also 
 Comics studies
 Graphic medicine

Notes

Further reading 
 Abel, Jessica & Matt Madden. Drawing Words and Writing Pictures. (First Second, 2008)
 Bang, Molly. Picture This: How Pictures Work. (A Bulfinch Press Book, Little, Brown and Company, 1991)
 Bowkett, Stephen, and Tony Hitchman. Using Comic Art to Improve Speaking, Reading and Writing (Routledge, 2012)
 Brunetti, Ivan. Cartooning: Philosophy and Practice (Yale University Press, 2011)
 Eisner, Will. Comics and Sequential Art. (Poorhouse Press, 1987)
 Elder, Josh (editor). Reading with Pictures: Comics that Make Kids Smarter! (Andrews McMeel Publishing, 2014)
 Gorman, Michele. Getting Graphic!: Comics for Kids. (Linworth Publishing, 2007)
 Hart, Melissa. Using Graphic Novels in the Classroom: Grades 4-8 (Teacher Created Resources, 2010)
 McCloud, Scott. Understanding Comics: The Invisible Art. (Harper Paperbacks, 1994)
 McCloud, Scott. Reinventing Comics: How Imagination and Technology Are Revolutionizing an Art Form. (Harper Paperbacks, 2000)
 McCloud, Scott. Making Comics: Storytelling Secrets of Comics, Manga and Graphic Novels. (Harper Paperbacks, 2006)
 Monnin, Katie. Teaching Graphic Novels: Practical Strategies for the Secondary ELA Classroom (Maupin House Publishing, Inc., 2010)
 Morice, Dave. Poetry Comics: An Animated Anthology. (Teachers & Writers Collaborative, 2002)
 Thompson, Terry. Adventures in Graphica: Using Comics and Graphic Novels to Teach Comprehension, 2-6 (Stenhouse Publishers, 2008)
 van der Sluis, Hendrik. Manga, graphic novels, and comics in Higher Education?. (New Vistas, 7(1): 24-30, 2021). .
 Whitworth, Jerry. A Case For Comics: Comic Books as an Educational Tool. (Sequential Tart, 2006)

External links 
 Comic Book Initiative — The State of Maryland's program of instructional strategies that support the use of graphic literature in elementary, secondary, adult, and corrections education.
 The Comic Book Project (Teachers College, Columbia University) — Arts-based literacy and learning initiative designed to help children forge an alternative pathway to literacy by writing, designing, and publishing original comic books.
 Imperial County Office of Education, Featured Stories - Using Sequential Arts Project (USA Project - Comic Books): A short video describing how comics are integrated in the classroom.
 En/Sane World — Information on "Sequential Art Narratives in Education (SANE)."
 First Second Lesson Plans — Lesson plans for a number of First Second books, ranging in grade level from 3-6 to high school.
 The Graphic Classroom — Resource for teachers and librarians to help stock educational-worthy graphic novels and comics in their classroom or school library.
 Mysterious World of Dr. Biology — Large collection of comic clipart and activity from Ask A Biologist.
 National Association of Comic Art Educators — Organization committed to promoting the acceptance of comics as an art form within educational institutions, and facilitating the teaching and use of comics in educational settings.
 Educational Comics for Kids - Educational comics on various topics such as study maths, learn to eat healthy or learning vocabulary.
 Comics English Reference list of research articles and books about comics in education.
 Comics in Education - Educational resource dedicated to the use of visual narrative in the K-12 classroom

Education
Educational comics
Creative writing programs